The Journal of Robotic Surgery is a peer-reviewed medical journal covering robotic surgery, including surgical simulation and medical imaging techniques. It is the official journal of the Society of Robotic Surgery. The journal was established in 2007 by Vipul Patel and is published by Springer Science+Business Media.

Abstracting and indexing 
The journal is abstracted and indexed in Scopus, Inspec, and Academic OneFile.

References

External links 
 

Publications established in 2007
Springer Science+Business Media academic journals
Surgery journals
Quarterly journals
English-language journals